The Vermillion River is a tributary of the Missouri River, 96 miles (154 km) long, in eastern South Dakota in the United States.

It is formed by the confluence of the East Fork Vermillion River and West Fork Vermillion River. Both forks flow south, roughly parallel, joining east of Parker. Its tributaries include White Stone Creek and Baptist Creek. Approximately once per 3.5 years, the Vermillion runs dry.

The Vermillion is a north-south river situated between the Big Sioux River and James River.

See also
List of rivers of South Dakota
List of tributaries of the Missouri River
James River
Big Sioux River
Siouxland

References

Rivers of South Dakota
Tributaries of the Missouri River
Rivers of Kingsbury County, South Dakota
Rivers of Miner County, South Dakota
Rivers of Turner County, South Dakota
Rivers of Clay County, South Dakota
Bodies of water of Clay County, South Dakota